Senator Lourey may refer to:

Becky Lourey (born 1943), Minnesota State Senate
Tony Lourey (born 1967), Minnesota State Senate

See also
Joel Lourie (born 1962), South Carolina State Senate